Staff Selection Commission (SSC) is an organisation under Government of India to recruit staff for various posts in the various ministries and departments of the government of India and in subordinate offices.

This commission is an attached office of the Department of Personnel and Training (DoPT) which consists of chairman, two members and a secretary-cum-controller of examinations. His post is equivalent to the level of additional secretary to the government of India.

The SSC decided to conduct the Multi-Tasking (Non-Technical) Staff examination in 13 Indian languages, which are Urdu, Tamil, Malayalam, Telugu, Kannada, Assamese, Bengali, Gujarati, Konkani, Meitei (Manipuri), Marathi, Odia and Punjabi, in addition to Hindi and English, out of the 22 official languages of the Indian Republic, for the first time in January 2023.

History 

The estimates committee in the parliament recommended the setting up of a Service Selection Commission in its 47th report (1967–68) for conducting examinations to recruit lower categories of posts. Later, in the Department of Personnel and Administrative Reforms, on 4 November 1975 government of India constituted a commission called Subordinate Service Commission. On 26 September 1977, Subordinate Services Commission was renamed as Staff Selection Commission. The functions of Staff Selection Commission were redefined by the government of India through Ministry of Personnel, Public Grievances and on 21 May 1999. Then the new constitution and functions of Staff Selection Commission came into effect from 1 June 1999. Every year conducts the Combined Graduate Level Examination for recruiting non-gazetted officers to various government jobs.

Headquarters  
Staff Selection Commission has its headquarters located at New Delhi. At present, it has seven Regional offices at Prayagraj, Mumbai, Kolkata, Guwahati, Chennai, Bangalore and New Delhi. It also has two Sub-  Regional offices at Raipur and Chandigarh.

Exams conducted by Staff Selection Commission 
Staff Selection Commission currently functions as a subordinate office of DOPT and is mainly engaged in conducting competitive exams for recruitment to various posts in the Staff Selection Commission departments, organizations. In the previous years, Staff Selection Commission has conducted various exams as given below
 SSC Combined Graduate Level (SSC CGL)
 SSC Combined Higher Secondary Level (SSC CHSL)
 SSC Stenographer C & D (SSC Stenographer)
 SSC Multitasking Staff (SSC MTS)
 SSC Junior Engineer (SSC JE)
 SSC Junior Hindi Translator (SSC JHT)
 SSC General Duty Constable (SSC GD)

 SSC Central Police Organization & SI (SSC CPO)
 SSC Selection Post

See also 
 List of Public service commissions in India

References

External links
 

Ministry of Personnel, Public Grievances and Pensions
Government recruitment in India
Employment agencies of India
1975 establishments in Delhi
Government agencies established in 1975